This is a list of all full international footballers to play for Yeovil Town. Players who were capped while a Yeovil Town player are marked in bold.

International representatives

Former Yeovil Town players

References

Internationals
Yeovil Town Internationals
Association football player non-biographical articles
Yeovil